6L or 6-L can refer to:

6L, or British Rail Class 202
IATA code for Aklak Air
Typ 6L, a model of SEAT Ibiza
Typ 6L, a model of SEAT Córdoba 
Model R-6L, a model of Curtiss Model R
TAF6L
6L, a model of HP LaserJet 6
6L, the production code for the 1984 Doctor Who serial Warriors of the Deep

See also
L6 (disambiguation)